Dwight Hillis "Red" Fisher (September 24, 1912 – October 18, 1991) was an American football and basketball coach and college athletics administrator. He served as the head football coach at Alabama A&M University in Normal, Alabama from 1937 to 1940, Wilberforce University in Wilberforce, Ohio in 1947, Alcorn Agricultural and Mechanical College—now known as Alcorn State University—Claiborne County, Mississippi from 1948 to 1956, and Bishop College in Marshall, Texas and Dallas from 1957 to 1973. Fisher was also the head basketball coach at Alabama A&M from 1937 to 1939 and Alcorn A&M from 1948 to 1956.

Alcorn State later named the field at its football and soccer stadium (Dwight Fisher Field at Casem–Spinks Stadium) in his honor.

Fisher was born on September 24, 1912, in Tallahassee, Florida, the younger of two children born to Rev. Lucien Clarence Fisher Jr. (1872–1947) and Cordelia Anne Quinn (1870–1949).

References

1912 births
1991 deaths
Alabama A&M Bulldogs basketball coaches
Alabama A&M Bulldogs football coaches
Alcorn State Braves and Lady Braves athletic directors
Alcorn State Braves basketball coaches
Alcorn State Braves football coaches
Bishop Tigers athletic directors
Bishop Tigers football coaches
Fisk Bulldogs football players
Players of American football from Tallahassee, Florida
Wilberforce Bulldogs football coaches
African-American coaches of American football
African-American players of American football
African-American basketball coaches
African-American college athletic directors in the United States
20th-century African-American sportspeople